The 1911–12 Irish Cup was the 32nd edition of the premier knock-out cup competition in Irish football.

The tournament for this season was beset by controversy - an Irish League Second Division had been formed for the first time, but the clubs in this division were placed in the draw for the Irish Cup by the Irish Football Association (IFA). However, these clubs did not wish to participate in the "senior" Irish Cup due to their "junior" status - their preference was to participate in the Steel & Sons Cup instead, which they were not permitted to do. These clubs subsequently withdrew from the Irish Cup despite being drawn originally in the first round.

After various disputes over the course of the season and by the time the tournament had reached the semi-finals, three of the four semi-finalists (Cliftonville, Glentoran and Shelbourne) resigned from the IFA and formed a "New Irish Football Association" and a New Irish Cup. Linfield remained a member of the original IFA and were declared winners of the unfinished Irish Cup, but eventually participated in the New Irish Cup under the name Belfast Blues. This arrangement only lasted for the remainder of this season and all clubs reverted back to competing in the Irish Cup by the following season.

The New Irish Cup was won by Belfast Celtic, who defeated Glentoran 2–0 in the final at Grosvenor Park. The New Irish Cup later became the Gold Cup and Belfast Celtic are therefore considered the inaugural winners of the Gold Cup.

Irish Cup

Results

First round

|}

All senior Irish League sides were given a bye to the next round. Due to a dispute between junior clubs and the Irish Football Association, all clubs in this round (with the exception of St James's Gate and Dublin University) withdrew from the competition at this stage.

Second round

|}

Third round

|}

Cliftonville, Linfield and Shelbourne were given a bye into the next round.

Semi-finals

|}

Cliftonville, Glentoran and Shelbourne resigned from the Irish Football Association due to disputes and the competition was left unfinished.

New Irish Cup

Results

First round

|}

1 Linfield were still members of the original Irish Football Association but decided to compete in the New Irish Cup. To avoid any conflicts they played under the name Belfast Blues instead of Linfield.

Semi-finals

|}

Final

References

External links
 Northern Ireland Cup Finals. Rec.Sport.Soccer Statistics Foundation (RSSSF)

Irish Cup seasons
1911–12 domestic association football cups
1911–12 in Irish association football